Topaz Winters (born September 25, 1999) is the pen name of Singaporean writer Priyanka Balasubramanian Aiyer.

Biography 
Winters was born in the United States and has lived in Singapore since she was seven years old. She attends Princeton University, where she has studied poetry and fiction under Danez Smith, Monica Youn, Rowan Ricardo Phillips, and Joyce Carol Oates. She writes on mental illnesses such as depression, anxiety, obsessive-compulsive disorder and hyperacusis, as well as her experiences of being a queer and disabled woman of color and an immigrant.

She is the author of the chapbook "Heaven or This" (2016) and the full-length poetry collections "poems for the sound of the sky before thunder" (2017) and "Portrait of My Body as a Crime I'm Still Committing" (2019). Her third poetry collection "So, Stranger" was released with Button Poetry in 2022. She is the youngest author to be published by Math Paper Press, the youngest Singaporean nominee for the Pushcart Prize, and the youngest visiting author at several MFA programs across the United States.

She is the editor-in-chief at the publishing house and literary journal Half Mystic. She also wrote and appeared in the 2017 short film SUPERNOVA (directed by Ishan Modi). With Crispin Rodrigues, she is the co-curator of the 2020 Singapore Writers Festival digital installation Letters From Home to Home.

Her peer-reviewed scholarly paper "Queering Poetics: The Impact of Poetry on LGBT+ Identity in Singaporean Adolescents" was published in the Journal of Homosexuality when she was 19 years old. She is the youngest author to be published in this journal.

References 

21st-century Singaporean writers
1999 births
Living people
21st-century Singaporean women writers
Queer writers